Leroy Binkley (1922–1994), aka "Roy", was an architect based out of Chicago.  He created modern homes in the Chicago area and some in Connecticut, including The Allen House (Westport, Connecticut) which is listed on the National Register of Historic Places.

Biography
Binkley was born in Chicago, Illinois. He studied under Mies van der Rohe. He later worked with John Black Lee at the office of Paul Schweikher in Chicago.

Personal life
He was married to Joan Florsheim, daughter of Claire (née Block) Florsheim Zeisler (1903–1991) and Harold Florsheim (son of Milton S. Florsheim, the founder of Florsheim Shoes); he had two children Lisa Binkley Brunke and Peter Binkley. His sister was married to art director and graphic designer Paul Rand for whom he designed a house. He died on March 3, 1994, at the age of 73 in Lake Forest, Illinois.

References

External links
Leroy Binkley

Architects from Illinois
1922 births
1994 deaths
Florsheim family